Ansari may refer to:

People
Ansar (Islam), an Islamic term that literally means "helpers" and denotes the Medinan citizens that helped the Islamic prophet Muhammad after the Hijra
Ansari (nesba), people known as Ansari or Al-Ansari as a nesba
Ansari (surname), contemporary people known as Ansari or Al-Ansari as a surname
Banu Aws, one of the main Arab tribes of Medina which, along with the Khazraj, constituted the Ansar ("helpers")
Momin Ansari, a Muslim community, found mainly in the world and West and North India and the province of Sindh in Pakistan
Ansari, an alternate term for Alawites or Alawis

Places
Ansari mountains, in Syria
Ansariye, Lebanon, a town in South Lebanon
Dupuk Ansari, a village in Khuzestan Province, Iran

Other uses
Ansari X Prize, a former space competition
Ansar Imam Mahdi, a 21st-century Shia movement that believes Ahmad al-Hassan is the messenger of the 12th imam

See also 
 Ansar (disambiguation)
 Ansari (surname)